Francisco Merry y Colom, 1st Count of Benomar (1 May 1829 – 4 January 1900) was a Spanish diplomat. He served as Spanish representative in Morocco after the Hispano–Moroccan War, travelling to Marrakesh in 1863. Later in his career, he also served as Ambassador in Berlin and Rome. He was the Spanish representative in the Berlin Conference.

Biography 
Francisco Merry y Colom was born in Seville on 1 May 1829.

He began his diplomatic career in 1849, serving as diplomatic attaché at the Ministry of State and later in Washington. Following the start of the War of Africa (the Hispano–Moroccan War), he was destined near the military leadership in the conflict and was involved in the negotiations of the peace settlements. He was appointed chargé d'affaires and consul general in Tangier in 1860.

In February 1863, he was summoned by General Serrano, the then Minister of State in the O'Donnell government (and a victor in the War), to lead a diplomatic mission near the Moroccan Sultan. Eventually, the new Foreign minister, Manuel Pando, briefed Merry with the specific goals for his mission. Those included the rehabilitation of Muley El-Abbás, the sultan's hispanophile brother, the fostering of commercial activity in Ceuta and Melilla by means of the creation of a custom, the opening of the Port of Agadir to Spanish ships, facilitating the meat provision to Ceuta, and the improvement on the status of Spaniards in Morocco. Upgraded to the rank of Minister–Resident, Merry thus travelled to Tangier, and then to Marrakesh and back to Tangier from May to July 1863. In his time in the Court of Mohammed IV, Merry helped to establish the basis for peacetime commercial and diplomatic relations with the Sherifian Empire.

Following his time in Africa, Merry was appointed as Minister Plenipotentiary to Berlin, where he was upgraded to the rank of Ambassador. Alfonso XII granted Merry the nobiliary title of Count of Benomar in 1878. He also served two times as Ambassador to the Kingdom of Italy.

He died in Rome on 4 January 1900. His daughter María del Carmen Merry y López de la Torre Ayllón succeeded him as Countess of Benomar.

While informed of a Euro-centric worldview, his diaries about his experience in 1863 (edited in 1984 in Madrid under the title Mi embajada extraordinaria a Marruecos en 1863) constitutes a source of great historiographical value both for the understanding of the Hispano–Moroccan relations and for observations on geographical, demographic, social, economic, cultural and political features of the country.

References 
Citations

Bibliography
 
 
 
 
 

1829 births
1900 deaths
Morocco–Spain relations
Ambassadors of Spain to Italy
Counts of Spain